Volodymyr Sydorenko (born 23 September 1976), also known as Wladimir Sidorenko, is a Ukrainian former professional boxer who competed from 2001 to 2010, and held the WBA bantamweight title from 2005 to 2008. As an amateur he won a silver medal at the 2001 World Championships, and consecutive gold at the 1998 and 2000 European Championships; all in the flyweight division. His twin brother is former amateur boxer Valeriy Sydorenko.

Amateur career
Sydorenko won a bronze medal at the 2000 Summer Olympics as a flyweight:
Defeated Daniel Ponce de León (Mexico) 16–8
Defeated Omar Andrés Narváez (Argentina) 16–10
Defeated Andrzej Rżany (Poland) RSC 3
Lost to Wijan Ponlid (Thailand) 11–14
1998 European Championships gold medalist
2000 European Championships gold medalist
2001 World Championships silver medalist
Sydorenko claimed an amateur record of 290–20.

Professional career
Sydorenko won the vacant WBA bantamweight title at expense of Julio Zarate on 26 February 2005. From there, he went on to defend that title six times.

He lost his title by unanimous decision to Anselmo Moreno in May 2008, and again in the rematch on 2 May 2009 by split decision. On 4 December 2010, he was knocked down 3 times en route to 4th-round KO loss to Nonito Donaire.

Professional boxing record

See also
List of WBA world champions
Olympic medalists in boxing
Ukraine at the 2000 Summer Olympics

References
sports-reference

External links

1976 births
People from Enerhodar
Ukrainian twins
Boxers at the 2000 Summer Olympics
Flyweight boxers
Living people
Olympic boxers of Ukraine
Olympic bronze medalists for Ukraine
World Boxing Association champions
World bantamweight boxing champions
Olympic medalists in boxing
Twin sportspeople
Ukrainian male boxers
AIBA World Boxing Championships medalists
Medalists at the 2000 Summer Olympics
Sportspeople from Zaporizhzhia Oblast